Hanji may refer to:
Korean paper (한지; hanji)
Hanji (film), a 2011 South Korean drama film
Hàn-jī (漢字): writing system of Hokkien language

See also
 漢字 (disambiguation)